Chamarajendra Wadiyar X (22 February 1863 – 28 December 1894) was the twenty-third Maharaja of Mysore between 1868 and 1894.

Adoption and accession
Chamarajendra Wadiyar X was born in the old palace in Mysore on 22 February 1863, as the third son of Sardar Chikka Krishnaraj Urs of the Bettada-Kote branch of the ruling clan. His father died about a week before his birth. His mother, Rajkumari Putammani Devi, was the eldest daughter of Maharaja Krishnaraja Wadiyar III. Following the failure of heirs male, Krishnaraja Wadiyar III decided to adopt Chamarajendra. The adoption was done on 18 June 1865 and was recognised by the British Government of India on 16 April 1867.

Krishnaraja Wadiyar III died on 27 March 1868, and Chamarajendra Wadiyar X ascended the throne at the royal palace, Mysore, on 23 September 1868. However, since 1831, the Kingdom of Mysore had been under the direct administration of the British Raj, which had earlier deposed Krishnaraja Wadiyar on allegations of misrule. Later, the Privy Council of the United Kingdom ordered the reversal of the British East India Company's decision to annexe Mysore. By the Rendition Act of 1881, the princely state of Mysore was reconstituted and restored to the Wadiyar dynasty. Chamarajendra Wadiyar X was groomed by the British to take charge of the administration. He was officially handed the reins of governance on 25 March 1881.

Reign
Although his reign proved to be a brief one, he left an indelible mark on the Kingdom of Mysore. He was aptly aided by Rangacharlu (1881–1883) CE and Sheshadri Iyer (1883–1901) two of the most competent Diwans.

He instituted the Representative Assembly of Mysore Kingdom in 1881. This was the first modern, democratic legislative institution of its kind in princely India. He sponsored the famous journey of Swami Vivekananda to Chicago in 1893. He gave primacy to women's education and founded the Kannada Bashojjivini School. He gave a fillip to the industrialisation of the Kingdom of Mysore by instituting several industrial schools and conducting the annual Dasara Industrial Exhibition. He facilitated the founding of Agricultural Banks to help finance farmers and initiated life insurance for government employees.

Many of the most famous landmarks of Mysore and Bangalore owe their existence to him. Prominent among these are: 
 Bangalore Palace, Bangalore
 Lalbagh Glass House, Bangalore
 Oriental Research Institute Mysore, Mysore (established in 1891)
 Maharaja's College, Mysore (1889) 
 Maharaja's Sanskrit School, Mysore
 Government Office, Mysore
 Lansdowne Bazaar, Mysore
 Dufferin Tower, Mysore
 Mysore Zoo, Mysore 
 Fern Hill Palace, Ooty

Patronage

Chamarajendra Wadiyar X was a great patron of arts and music; his court boasted of artists like Veena Subbanna, Veena Seshanna, K. Vasudevacharya. Veena Padmanabiah, Mysore Karigiri Rao, and Bidaram Krishnappa, among others.

The maharaja was a violin virtuoso himself and used to daily provide accompaniment to Veena Subbanna's vocal and Veena Sheshanna's veena performances. His favourite kriti's included Sujana Jeevana and Lavanya Rama. He was also a connaisseur of Javali's Kritis (Javalis are a genre of Carnatic music).

Family 
In May 1878, Chamarajendra Wadiyar married Maharani Kempananjammanni Devi, daughter of an arasu of Kalale, a prominent nobleman of Mysore state. They had four sons and three daughters, of whom the following survived to adulthood:
Krishna Raja Wadiyar IV, succeeded his father as Maharaja of Mysore.
 Prince Kanteerava Narasimharaja Wadiyar, father of Maharaja Jayachamarajendra Wadiyar.
 Princess Jayalakshammani, (1881–1924), married in 1897, her youngest maternal uncle, M. Kantaraj Urs, was the Diwan of Mysore between 1919 and 1922. Jayalakshmi Vilas Palace, Manasa Gangotri, now Post-Graduate Centre of the University of Mysore, was built as her residence.
 Princess Krishnajammani, (1883–1904), married in 1896, Col. Desaraja Urs, Commander of the Mysore Armed Forces, from the Bagle family of Mogur in Mysore State. Karanjivilas Palace, now Indian Postal Training Centre, was built for her. They had one son and three daughters. She and her three daughters died of tuberculosis. The royal family built the Krishnajammanni Sanitorium in her memory. Her son Rajkumar C Desaraj Urs had three children – Rajkumar Prithviraj Urs (m. Shivamala Ghatge and had 4 daughters and one son, Yogendra Prithviraj Urs), Col Desaraj Urs, and Geeta Devi Urs.
 Princess Cheluvajammani (1886–1936), married in 1900, Sardar M. Lakshmikanta Raj Urs, a nobleman of Mysore State. The Cheluvambavilas Palace, now the headquarters of CFTRI, was built as her residence. There is also a maternity hospital and park named after her.

Chamarajndra Wadiyar died of diphtheria, in Calcutta, on 28 December 1894, aged 31. He was succeeded by his 10-year-old son, Krishnaraja Wadiyar IV. His wife, Maharani Kempa Nanjammani Vani Vilasa Sannidhana Avaru, served as regent of Mysore during the minority of their son.

Places in honour 

 Chamaraja Road, Vadodara: It was named after Chamaraja Wodeyar who was a close friend of Maharaja Sayajirao Gaekwad III to mark the friendship between Maharaja Sayajirao Gaekwad III. Similarly a road in Mysore as Sayajirao Road. Chamaraja Road starts from Eastern gate of Lakshmi Vilas Palace and has other prominent landmarks like Khanderao Market, which hosts the office of Vadodara Municipal Corporation and others before terminating near Bhagat Singh Chowk.
 Chamaraja (Vidhana Sabha constituency), a constituency in Karnataka Legislative Assembly
 Chamaraja Road, Mysore, a road in Mysore
 Chamaraja Road, a road in Vijayawada
 Chamaraja Road, a road in Srinivaspur

Notes

 
 Sir T. R. A. Thumboo Chetty, Raja Dharma Pravina, C.I.E. Chief Judge of the Chief Court of Mysore and the Offg. Dewan of Mysore.

External links

1863 births
1894 deaths
Kings of Mysore
Chamarajendra X
Knights Grand Commander of the Order of the Star of India
Infectious disease deaths in India
Respiratory disease deaths in India
Deaths from diphtheria
19th-century Indian royalty